Phillip Roger Martin (April 2, 1928 – June 24, 2008) was a guard in the National Basketball Association. Martin was drafted in the Milwaukee Hawks in the fourth round of the 1954 NBA draft and played with the team for seven games early that season.

References

External links
 Toledo athletic HOF bio

1928 births
2008 deaths
American men's basketball players
Basketball players from Michigan
Michigan State University alumni 
Milwaukee Hawks draft picks
Milwaukee Hawks players
Small forwards
Sportspeople from Jackson, Michigan
Toledo Rockets men's basketball players